Marek Ariel Schulman (born October 2, 1981) is an American filmmaker and actor. He starred in, produced, and directed the 2010 documentary Catfish, and directed Paranormal Activity 3, Paranormal Activity 4, Nerve and Project Power with Henry Joost.

Career
Schulman has directed the movies Catfish, Paranormal Activity 3, Paranormal Activity 4, and Nerve alongside Joost. He graduated from the Tisch School of the Arts' film program in 2004. Schulman and Joost founded the production company Supermarché.

His younger brother, Nev Schulman, is the host of Catfish: The TV Show on MTV. They are of German-Jewish, Russian-Jewish, Polish-Jewish, and Romanian-Jewish descent.

In 2017, Schulman and Joost were hired to write and direct an adaptation of Mega Man for 20th Century Fox. In 2019, following Disney's acquisition of 21st Century Fox's assets, the film along with numerous Video Game based movies in development at Fox were cancelled. However, this turned out to be untrue, with Capcom confirming that the film was still in development. In 2020, it was revealed that Mattson Tomlin had been hired to help co-write the screenplay.

In 2018, Schulman co-directed the Netflix sci-fi superhero thriller film Project Power alongside Henry Joost from a screenplay by Mattson Tomlin. The film stars Jamie Foxx, Joseph Gordon-Levitt and Dominique Fishback. It was released on August 14, 2020.

Personal life
His younger brother is Nev Schulman, the host of MTV's Catfish: The TV Show and the subject of his premiere documentary, Catfish.

Filmography (with Henry Joost)
Film
 Paranormal Activity 3 (2011)
 Paranormal Activity 4 (2012)
 Nerve (2016)
 Viral (2016)
 Project Power (2020)
 Secret Headquarters (2022) (Also writer)

Documentary films

Television

Acting roles

References

External links
 
  Ariel Schulman at the Music Television

Male actors from New York City
American people of Israeli descent
Jewish American male actors
Place of birth missing (living people)
1981 births
Living people
Horror film directors
Tisch School of the Arts alumni